Quarna Sopra is a comune (municipality) in the Province of Verbano-Cusio-Ossola in the Italian region Piedmont, located about 75 kilometres (47 mi) from Malpensa Airport in Milan,  northeast of Turin and about  southwest of Verbania.

Quarna Sopra borders the following municipalities: Germagno, Loreglia, Omegna, Quarna Sotto, Valstrona.

Sights include the Belvedere, a balcony over the Lake Orta with an view of all the surrounding area.

References

Cities and towns in Piedmont